R560 road may refer to:
 R560 road (Ireland)
 R560 road (South Africa)